Trimeresurus venustus is a venomous pitviper species endemic to southern Thailand. Its common names include beautiful pit viper and brown-spotted pit viper.

References

venustus
Reptiles of Thailand
Reptiles described in 1991